The Malung Church is a church building in Malung, Sweden. Belonging to the Malung Parish of the Church of Sweden, it is supposed to have been built in 1365.

References

External links

Churches in Dalarna County
Churches in the Diocese of Västerås